Demir Elmaağaçlı (born ) is a Turkish male compound archer and part of the national team.

Sport career
Elmaağaçlı won the silver medal at the 2008 World Archery Youth Championships held in Antalya, Turkey. He was part of the Turkish team, which won the silver medal at the 2014 European Archery Championships in Vagharshapat, Armenia. He participated in the team event and individual event at the 2015 World Archery Championships in Copenhagen, Denmark. He was member of the silver medal winning mixed team at the first stage of the 2015 Archery World Cup held in Shanghai, China. He became gold medalist in the compound individual event of the 2015 World Cup final in Mexico City, Mexico.

He won the silver medal in the men's team compound event at the 2022 European Indoor Archery Championships held in Laško, Slovenia.

He won the silver medal in the men's team compound event at the Laško, Slovenia event in the 2022 European Indoor Archery Championships.

References

1990 births
Living people
Turkish male archers
Place of birth missing (living people)
People from Kayseri
Universiade medalists in archery
Universiade silver medalists for Turkey
Medalists at the 2017 Summer Universiade
21st-century Turkish people